The 1984 Montana State Bobcats football team represented the Montana State University (MSU) in the 1984 NCAA Division I-AA football season. The team was led by Dave Arnold in his second season as a head coach. The Bobcats played their home games at Reno H. Sales Stadium.

Schedule

Game summaries

Mesa State

Roster

References

Montana State
Montana State Bobcats football seasons
NCAA Division I Football Champions
Big Sky Conference football champion seasons
Montana State Bobcats football